	
There are over 20,000 Grade II* listed buildings in England. This page is a list of the 95 Grade II* listed buildings in the district of Waverley in Surrey.  For similar lists in respect of the other ten districts of Surrey see Grade II* listed buildings in Surrey.
	 	
There are 95 Grade II* listed buildings in Waverley, with the largest number, 44, in the town of Farnham which is one of three towns in the district. Castle Street in Farnham has 17 Grade II* listed buildings, leading architectural historian Alec Clifton-Taylor to note that "for sheer visual delight, this street has few equals in all England".

|}

See also
 Grade I listed buildings in Surrey (Waverley)

Notes

References

External links
 English Heritage Images of England

Waverley, Surrey
 Waverley, Surrey
Borough of Waverley